Kaldbaksbotnur is a village on the island of Streymoy in the Faroe Islands.

Geography

Kaldbaksbotnur is located on the east coast of Streymoy. The village consists two farms. One farm is located in the bottom of Kaldbaksfjørður on the western side of the river and this farm is also called Northern part of Sund. The other is on the eastern side of the river and relates to Kaldbak. When the road to Tórshavn opened in 1980 this connected both Kaldbaksbotnur and Kaldbak to the island's road network.

In 1992 the 2816m tunnel Kollfjarðartunnilin was opened from Kaldbaksbotnur to Kollafjørður and this is now the main route from Tórshavn to the villages in the north of the island.

Throughout the 1990s Kaldbaksbotnur was served by bus route 4 operated by the blue Bygdaleiðir country buses which passed through the village on their route from Tórshavn to Kaldbak. Route 5, added in 2001, also ran from Tórshavn through Kaldbaksbotnur to the township of Kollafjørður. Since 2003, route 4 is running to Kollafjørður, while route 5 is running to Kaldbak. Both operate several times per day.

There is a Danish Navy base in the mountains above Kaldbaksbotnur in a valley called Mjørkadalur (Fog Valley). On the top of the mountains there is a NATO early-warning radar system.

Geology
A sample of stalagmitic white Mordenite (Na2CaK2)Al2Si10O24·7H2O) from Kaldbaksbotnur was collected by Volker Betz and can be seen at http://www.mindat.org/photo-177823.html

Kaldbaksbotnur in music
Kaldbaksbotnur is referred to in a song Útsetin performed by Teitur Lassen on his 2007 album Káta Hornið. It is performed in the Faroese language but the extract below (the 3rd and 4th verses out of eight) includes an English translation:

See also
 List of towns in the Faroe Islands

References

External links
Faroeislands.dk: Kaldbaksbotnur Images and description of all cities on the Faroe Islands.

Populated places in the Faroe Islands